The regions of Kazakhstan are divided into 170 districts (pl. , audandar). The districts are listed below, by region:

Abai
Abay District
Ayagoz District
Beskaragay District
Borodulikha District
Kokpekti District
Tarbagatay District
Urzhar District
Zharma District

Akmola
Akkol District
Arshaly District
Astrakhan District
Atbasar District
Bulandy District
Burabay District
Egindikol District
Enbekshilder District
Ereymentau District
Esil District
Korgalzhyn District
Sandyktau District
Shortandy District
Tselinograd District
Zerendi District
Zhaksy District
Zharkain District

Aktobe
Alga District
Ayteke Bi District
Bayganin District
Kargaly District
Kobda District
Khromtau District
Martuk District
Mugalzhar District
Oiyl District
Shalkar District
Temir District
Yrgyz District

Almaty
Balkhash District
Enbekshikazakh District
Ile District, Kazakhstan
Karasay District
Raiymbek District
Talgar District
Uygur District
Zhambyl District, Almaty Region

Atyrau
Inder District
Isatay District
Kurmangazy District
Kyzylkoga District
Makat District
Makhambet District
Zhylyoi District

East Kazakhstan
Glubokoe District
Katonkaragay District
Kurshim District
Shemonaikha District
Tarbagatay District
Ulan District

Jetisu
Aksu District
Alakol District
Eskeldi District
Karatal District
Kerbulak District
Koksu District
Panfilov District
Sarkant District

Karagandy
Abay District, Karagandy Region
Aktogay District, Karagandy Region
Bukhar-Zhyrau District
Karkaraly District
Nura District
Osakarov District
Shet District

Kostanay
Altynsarin District
Amangeldi District
Auliekol District
Denisov District
Fyodorov District
Kamysty District
Karabalyk District
Karasu District
Kostanay District
Mendykara District
Nauyrzym District
Sarykol District
Taran District
Uzunkol District
Zhangeldi District
Zhetikara District

Kyzylorda
Aral District
Karmakshy District
Kazaly District
Shieli District
Syrdariya District
Zhalagash District
Zhanakorgan District

Mangystau
Beyneu District
Karakiya District
Mangystau District
Munaily District
Tupkaragan District

North Kazakhstan
Aiyrtau District
Akkayin District
Akzhar District
Esil District
Gabit Musirepov District (Tselinniy)
Kyzylzhar District
Magzhan Zhumabaev District (Bulaev)
Mamlyut District
Shal akyn District (Sergeev)
Taiynsha District
Timiryazev District
Ualikhanov District
Zhambyl District

Pavlodar
Akku District
Aktogay District, Pavlodar Region
Bayanaul District
Ertis District
Kashyr District
May District
Pavlodar District
Sharbakty District
Uspen District
Zhelezin District

Turkistan
Baydibek District
Kazygurt District
Maktaaral District
Ordabasy District
Otyrar District
Saryagash District
Sayram District
Shardara District
Sozak District
Tole Bi District
Tulkibas District

Ulytau
Ulytau District
Zhanaarka District

West Kazakhstan
Akzhaik District
Bokey Orda District
Borili District
Karatobe District
Kaztal District
Shyngyrlau District
Syrym District
Taskala District
Terekti District
Zelenov District
Zhanakala District
Zhanybek District

Zhambyl
Bayzak District
Korday District
Merke District
Moiynkum District
Sarysu District
Shu District
Talas District
Turar Ryskulov District
Zhambyl District, Zhambyl Region
Zhualy District

See also
Regions of Kazakhstan

References

External links
Statoids
Districts of Kazakhstan (map in English)
Districts of Kazakhstan (map in Russian)
Subdivisions of Kazakhstan in local languages

 
Subdivisions of Kazakhstan
Kazakhstan, Districts
Kazakhstan 2
Kazakhstan 2
Districts, Kazakhstan
Kazakhstan geography-related lists